Bailén (archaically known as Baylen in English) is a town in the province of Jaén, Spain.

History 
Bailén is probably the ancient Baecula, where the Romans, under Scipio the elder, signally defeated the Carthaginians in 209 and 206 B.C. In its neighbourhood, also, in 1212, was fought the great Battle of Las Navas de Tolosa, in which, according to the ancient chroniclers, the Castilians under Alphonso VIII, slew 200,000 Almohads, and themselves only lost 25 men. Although this estimate is absurd, the victory of the Christians was complete.

There is a convent that dates from 729.

In 1808, during the Peninsular War, it was the site of a series of clashes (the Battle of Bailén) at which General Castaños defeated General Pierre Dupont. The capitulation, signed at Andújar by Dupont on the 23rd of July 1808, involved the surrender of 17,000 men to the Spaniards, and was the first severe blow suffered by the French in the Peninsular War.

Economy 
The town has many quarries, resulting in a reputation for craft products.

Significant Births
 Felipe de Neve Founder of Los Angeles, California.
 Gregorio Manzano Football coach.

Twin towns
 Móstoles, Spain
 Spétses, Greece
 Yapeyú, Argentina

Notes

References

External links 
Bicentenario de la Batalla de Bailen

 Municipalities in the Province of Jaén (Spain)